The Biel–Magglingen Funicular (German: Magglingenbahn; French: Funiculaire Bienne–Macolin) is a funicular railway in the bilingual city of Biel/Bienne in the Swiss canton of Bern. The funicular links Biel/Bienne at 435 m with Magglingen/Macolin at 873 m in the Jura mountains above the town. The line with a length of 1693 m has a maximum incline of 32% and a difference of elevation of 442 m. The funicular with two cars has a single track with a passing loop.

The line is owned and operated by Verkehrsbetriebe Biel/Transports publics biennois (short: VB/TPB) since 2014, when it absorbed "FUNIC AG" that also operated nearby Bienne–Evilard Funicular.Initially it was built by Drahtseilbahn-Gesellschaft Biel-Magglingen in 1887.

Operation 
The line has the following parameters:

See also 
 List of funicular railways
 List of funiculars in Switzerland

Gallery

References

External links 

Official web site of the FUNIC company (in German and French)

Funicular railways in Switzerland
Public transport in Switzerland
Transport in Biel/Bienne
Magglingen